Spart usually refers to
A member of the International Communist League (Fourth Internationalist) also called the Spartacist League
Dave Spart, absurd ultra-left-wing character satirised in Private Eye